This is a list of the constituent colleges of the Old University of Leuven (founded 1425; suppressed 1797). Many of them are listed heritage sites and some are in use by the current Katholieke Universiteit Leuven.

Pedagogies
Four of the colleges were specifically teaching colleges for undergraduates in the Liberal Arts, and these were called Pedagogies.

Colleges
The others provided residential facilities for students studying at the advanced faculties (law, medicine, theology).

References

 Historische universiteitscolleges in Leuven definitief beschermd, Archeonet.be, 13 Nov 2009. Accessed 15 Feb. 2015.
 Cornelius Van Gestel, Historia sacra et profana Archiepiscopatus Mechliniensis (The Hague, 1725), 182-186.
 Valerius Andreas, Fasti academici studii generalis Lovaniensis  (Leuven, 1650), 252-330.
 Inventaris Onroerend Erfgoed (Flemish heritage inventory). Accessed 15 Feb. 2015.

Catholic University of Leuven
Lists of university and college buildings
Lists of protected heritage sites in Belgium